Grace Beside Me is an Australian fantasy drama television series for children which premiered on NITV on 16 February 2018 and later aired on ABC Me. The series is based on the novel Grace Beside Me, by Sue McPherson, and was filmed in the Scenic Rim Region in South East Queensland. The television adaptation was produced by a team composed entirely of women, including Aboriginal screenwriters.

Set in the fictional country town of Laurel Dale, the series follows an Indigenous Australian teenager named Fuzzy Mac, who navigates her way through the social and personal issues of adolescence, while also being faced with the power of being able to communicate with spirits. Overriding themes include the focus on identity and belonging, while family and kinship is also explored. Australian Aboriginal culture is prominently featured, with the series produced in association with Screen Australia's Indigenous Department and the Australian Children's Television Foundation.

Grace Beside Me has received a positive reception for its Australian Aboriginal representation. It was nominated for an AACTA Award for Best Children's Program in 2018, and nominated twice at the Logie Awards for Most Outstanding Children's Program. The program won the First Nations Media Award for Best Drama or Comedy in 2018, and an Australian Directors' Guild Award for the episode "Sorry" in 2019.

Premise
Fuzzy Mac (Kyliric Masella) is a thirteen year old Indigenous Australian girl who discovers that she can communicate with spirits. She lives in the small regional community of Laurel Dale with her eccentric grandparents, Nan (Tessa Rose) and Pop (Charles Passi), who strive to teach her about tradition and their ancestors. Her family represents a mix of Aboriginal Australian, Irish and South Sea Islander traditions. Fuzzy's father, Sonny (Lasarus Ratuere), is a FIFO worker in the mines and her mother, Grace (Umema Curtis), died at the age of nineteen when Fuzzy was a baby. The pair moved in with Sonny's parents when Fuzzy was born.

Episodes depict Fuzzy's transition into adolescence as she begins high school along with her best friends Tui (Kyliric Masella) and Yar (Tjiirdm McGuire). On her thirteenth birthday, Fuzzy discovers that she can see ghosts and communicate with spirits. Her grandmother guides her as she begins her journey as a seer, and encourages her to fulfill her role of looking after Lola's Forest, a sacred site in Laurel Dale, and all of the spirits living within. Fuzzy comes to terms with her gift and learns how to use it responsibly, as she assists the spirits she encounters in carrying out their incomplete business. Other stories detail the friends' rivalry with their classmates, Cat (Emma Cobb) and Emmy (Lucy Adair).

Cast and characters

Main
 Kyliric Masella as Fuzzy Mac, a curious and confident thirteen year old with Aboriginal and Australian South Sea Islander heritage, who has a passion for art. She discovers that she can communicate with spirits.
 Tjiirdm McGuire as Yar, a flamboyant and theatrical friend of Fuzzy's.
 Mairehau Grace as Tui, Fuzzy's best friend, of Māori heritage, who has a love of language and technology.
 Charles Passi as Pop McCardell, Fuzzy's open-minded and witty grandfather, who is Australian South Sea Islander, and plays the bagpipes.
 Tessa Rose as Nan McCardell, Fuzzy's grandmother and a member of the Stolen Generations, with a gift for sensing the dead.

Recurring
 Simone Landers as Lola, the spirit of Fuzzy's great-grandmother who appears to her as an eleven-year-old girl. She died of natural causes while living in the forest, after escaping the Christian mission. Her spirit is the custodian of Lola's Forest. Pauline Whyman plays the spirit of Lola when she appears to Fuzzy as an older woman.
 Andrew Buchanan as Mayor Ridgeway, Cat's father and the mayor of Laurel Dale, formerly a local sports player.
 Elaine Crombie as Miss Long, Fuzzy's seventh grade teacher.
 Emma Cobb as Cat Ridgeway, a self-absorbed schoolgirl who is the daughter of the mayor.
 Lucy Adair as Emmy Chu, a popular schoolgirl who is not comfortable with sharing her Chinese heritage.
 Roxanne McDonald as Aunty Min, Nan's younger sister, a local historian, who was also removed from her family as a child.
 Ginger Dickens as Esther, Fuzzy's eleven year old cousin living with Aunty Min, who speaks her mind and is known by family as "Special Girl Esther".
 Jack Henry as Mr. Steiner, Fuzzy's grumpy German neighbour with a passion for gardening, who teaches Esther violin.
 Dylan Drabowicz as Jesse, a fourteen year old skater who develops a crush on Tui.
 Peter Sandy as Johnno Buchanan, Fuzzy's boisterous next door neighbour, often getting into trouble with his younger siblings, George and Billy.
 Jada Page as Georgia "George" Buchanan, sister of Johnno and Billy and next door neighbour of Fuzzy.
 Braden Lewis as Billy Buchanan, the youngest of the three Buchanan children who live next door to Fuzzy.
 Michael Fryer as Teddy, a thirteen year old schoolboy who moves to Laurel Dale after his parents' divorce.

Guest stars
 Lasarus Ratuer as Sonny McCardell, Fuzzy's father, and the son of Nan and Pop, who works in the mines as a FIFO worker.
 Umema Curtis as Grace McCardell, the spirit of Fuzzy's mother who has passed away, and appears to Fuzzy. Like Fuzzy, she has a talent for drawing, and her totem is the magpie.

Production

Conception

In January 2017, Australian television network NITV commissioned its first scripted local drama, a children's series entitled Grace Beside Me, which would centre around a young Indigenous Australian teenager and her every day struggles with the issues of adolescence. The series, aimed at 8–12 year olds, was described as a combination of 21st century issues and the inclusion of Aboriginal culture, as the protagonist, Fuzzy Mac, learns to find her place in the two different worlds. The series takes the form of a fantasy drama. Based on the 2012 novel written by Sue McPherson, the initial series order was for 13 episodes, to be produced by Magpie Pictures, and to premiere on NITV. The series was announced in association with Screen Australia's Indigenous Department, who stated their focus in creating Indigenous and culturally diverse content for young Australians. Production was revealed to be led by an all-female team of producers, including Aboriginal producers and screenwriters. The episodes were co-commissioned by the Australian Broadcasting Corporation to playout on ABC Me, with an additional presale license by pay-TV network Disney Channel for broadcast in Australia and New Zealand. The series is distributed internationally by 9 Story Media Group.

Production of the series was led by producers Lois Randall and Dena Curtis. Mary-Ellen Mullane served as the executive for NITV, and Libbie Doherty was appointed executive for the ABC.

Writing
Scripts for Grace Beside Me are written in the genre of magic realism, with the goal of depicting contemporary teenage life. Curtis and Randall appreciated McPherson's depiction of small regional communities, having both come from regional backgrounds themselves. The original novel was written for a teenager audience, but the story was reworked to target a younger 8–12 year old demographic for the television series. The writers and producers consulted with Aboriginal Healers, Australian South Sea Islanders and the Mununjali Aboriginal Elders Group from Beaudesert, Queensland throughout the writing process. The Mununjali language is used in the series, with episodes inspired by stories told by Mununjali Elders. Māori writer Briar Grace-Smith also contributed to the scripts, to add an authentic voice to Māori character Tui. Grace-Smith described the writing process as "snappy and fast-paced". Other writers for the series included Gina Roncoli, Danielle MacLean, Sue McPherson and Tristan Savage.

Filming
Production for Grace Beside Me began in July 2017, being filmed over eleven weeks in the Scenic Rim Region in South East Queensland. The series was filmed on the Traditional Lands of the Mununjali and Ugarapul People. The fictional town of Laurel Dale was created through the use of buildings and landmarks from Boonah and Beaudesert. Local townspeople were used as extras during filming, and the cast were invited to a welcoming ceremony held by Beaudesert Elders. The series was directed by Lynn-Maree Danzey, Nicholas Verso and Beck Cole. Kyliric Masella was announced to be playing Fuzzy Mac, with Mairehau Grac and Tjiirdm McGuire as supporting characters Tui and Yar respectively. Masella became close with her co-stars, who she shared a house with while filming. The cast were also required to complete school work during production.

The theme song, "Grace Beside Me", was composed by Amanda Brown and Emily Wurramara and performed by Wurramara.

The series premiered on NITV on 16 February 2018. It later premiered on ABC Me on 8 July 2018 and on Disney Channel on 5 March 2019.

Episodes

Reception
Grace Beside Me has received positive reviews based on its representation of Australian Aboriginal culture. Mandy Nolan of website Mamamia praised the Indigenous Australian cast, stating "I want my white child to hear black stories". She noted that the program's point of difference was that it didn't tell the stories of "white kids", like many other series. She also expressed her interest in viewing the program as a parent, along with her children. Reviewing the sixth episode "Hangi Sleepover", Melinda Houston commended the "deft" writing, and described the episode as "fresh, honest and funny".

Awards and nominations

References
Notes

Citations

Bibliography
 

National Indigenous Television original programming
Australian Broadcasting Corporation original programming
2018 Australian television series debuts
Australian children's television series
Australian drama television series
English-language television shows
Television series about teenagers
Television shows set in Queensland